Desencuentro may refer to:

 Desencuentro (1964 TV series), a Mexican telenovela
 Desencuentro (1997 TV series), a Mexican telenovela 
 Desencuentro (song), a 2017 song by Residente